The Louise Michel Battalion were two unconnected battalions of French-speaking volunteers from France and Belgium in the International Brigades of the Spanish Civil War. They were named after Louise Michel, a heroine of the Paris Commune of 1871 known as the "Red virgin of Montmartre". Both battalions mustered in November and December 1936.

 The first battalion was an existing group of volunteers (see Centuria) who had been operating in Barcelona. This was absorbed into battalions being formed for the XI International Brigade.
 The second was raised at Albacete from French-speaking volunteers. Towards the end of January 1938, it was merged into the Henri Vuilleman Battalion of the XIV International Brigade.

References

Further reading
Hugh Thomas, The Spanish Civil War, 4th Rev. Ed. 2001.
Antony Beevor, The Battle for Spain, 2006.
 Order of Battle website
 	Associació Catalana Website

Military units and formations established in 1936
Military units and formations disestablished in 1938
International Brigades
Military history of Belgium